Allen Lee Geiberger Sr. (born September 1, 1937) is an American former professional golfer.

Professional career
Geiberger turned pro in 1959 and joined the PGA Tour in 1960. Geiberger won 11 tournaments on the PGA Tour, the first being the 1962 Ontario Open and the biggest being the 1966 PGA Championship, a major title. He won the Tournament Players Championship in 1975, and played on the Ryder Cup teams in 1967 and 1975. Geiberger also won 10 times on the Senior PGA Tour, now called the Champions Tour.

Mr. 59
During the second round of the Danny Thomas Memphis Classic in 1977, Geiberger became the first player in history to post a score of 59 (−13) in a PGA Tour-sanctioned event. Starting on the tenth tee of the Colonial Country Club in Cordova, Tennessee, he shot a bogey-free round of six pars, 11 birdies, and an eagle on the  layout.

Geiberger won the tournament, though not handily. He shot even-par 72 in the first and third rounds, and was two strokes down to Gary Player on Sunday after a 38 (+2) on the front nine put him at 241 (−11) for 63 holes. He regained the lead with a 32 (−4) on the back nine to finish at 273 (−15), two strokes ahead of Player and Jerry McGee.

Scorecard: Friday, June 10, 1977

Source:

Personal life
Geiberger was born in Red Bluff, California, the son of Ray and Mabel Geiberger. His first big tournament win was the 1954 National Jaycee Championship. He graduated from Santa Barbara High School, attended Menlo College and graduated from the University of Southern California in 1959.

Geiberger has six children. His son Brent Geiberger is also a professional golfer who won two PGA Tour events. Another son, John, was the coach of the Pepperdine University golf team from 1996-2012, and won the NCAA Championship in 1997. Geiberger's father was one of the victims of the Tenerife airport disaster in 1977.

Geiberger had surgery in 1980 to remove his colon due to inflammatory bowel disease and has an ileostomy.

Professional wins (30)

PGA Tour wins (11)

PGA Tour playoff record (1–1)

Japan Golf Tour wins (1)

Other wins (6)
1961 Utah Open
1962 Caracas Open, Almaden Open Invitational
1979 Spalding Invitational
1982 Frontier Airlines Open
1985 Colorado Open

Senior PGA Tour wins (10)

Senior PGA Tour playoff record (1-1)

Other senior wins (2)
1989 Liberty Mutual Legends of Golf (with Harold Henning)
2008 Liberty Mutual Legends of Golf - Demaret Division (with Jimmy Powell)

Major championships

Wins (1)

Results timeline

CUT = missed the halfway cut
"T" indicates a tie for a place.

Summary

Most consecutive cuts made – 20 (1963 PGA – 1970 Masters)
Longest streak of top-10s – 2 (twice)

The Players Championship

Wins (1)

Results timeline

CUT = missed the halfway cut
"T" indicates a tie for a place.

See also
List of golfers with most Champions Tour wins
List of men's major championships winning golfers
Lowest rounds of golf

References

External links
Al Geiberger at the PGA Tour official site

Milwaukee Journal Sentinel article with quotes from Geiberger

American male golfers
USC Trojans men's golfers
PGA Tour golfers
PGA Tour Champions golfers
Winners of men's major golf championships
Ryder Cup competitors for the United States
Golfers from California
People from Red Bluff, California
Sportspeople from Palm Springs, California
1937 births
Living people